The following article presents a summary of the 1907 football (soccer) season in Brazil, which was the 6th season of competitive football in the country.

Campeonato Paulista

Final Standings

SC Internacional de São Paulo declared as the Campeonato Paulista champions.

State championship champions

(1)In 1997, Fluminense and Botafogo were declared as the 1907 Rio de Janeiro State Championship champions.

References

 Brazilian competitions at RSSSF

 
Seasons in Brazilian football
Brazil